The Deputy Mayor of the Metropolitan Borough Wigan is the Vice Chairman of Wigan Council, elected annually by the Wigan Council General Assembly to serve as 'Second Citizen', assisting the Mayor and Mayoress in official duties, and assuming the role of council chairman in the absence of the mayor. The Deputy Mayor is also first in the Mayoral Line of Succession should the office of the mayor become vacant. The position of Deputy Mayoress of Wigan is usually held by the wife of the deputy mayor, or a relative, or a fellow councillor if unmarried.

Origins and duties
The Office of the Deputy Mayor is created under Article 5, Section 1 of the Constitution of Wigan Council by legislative statute, same as the office of the mayor. The deputy mayor assists in the duties of the mayor including taking part in civil and private events, as well as attending engagements of their own. When the mayor is temporarily vacant, as vice-chairman, the deputy mayor will act as chairman pro tempore of the council.

The deputy mayor is elected at annual meeting, on the same day as the election of the new mayor. The position of Deputy Mayoress of Wigan is usually held by the wife of the deputy mayor, or a relative, or a fellow councillor if unmarried. However, if there is a lady deputy mayor in office, their spouse would assume the title 'Deputy Mayors Consort', or a relative would assume the role of deputy mayoress.

Current Deputy Mayor
The current Deputy Mayor is Cllr Kevin Anderson.

Title and style
The full style of the Deputy Mayor is "The Deputy Mayor of Wigan Council, Councillor [Name]" and in verbal address, they are referred to as Mr Deputy Mayor or Madam Deputy Mayor. The full style of the incumbent Deputy Mayor is "The Deputy Mayor of Wigan Council, Councillor Michael McLoughlin".

When addressing the incumbent deputy mayoress, they are referred to as Deputy Mayoress, or Madam Deputy Mayoress. When the incumbent is being presented, they are referred to as The Deputy Mayoress of Wigan [Name].

When the incumbent is a Lady Deputy Mayor, their consort is styled The Deputy Mayors Consort [Name] when presented, or is simply referred to by their name e.g. Mr or if also a councillor they are addressed as Councillor [Name].

See also
 Mayor of Wigan
 Mayoress of Wigan
 Metropolitan Borough of Wigan

External links
 Mayoralty of Wigan
 Wigan Council

Metropolitan Borough of Wigan